Nowa Wola  is a village in the administrative district of Gmina Zelów, within Bełchatów County, Łódź Voivodeship, in central Poland.

References

Villages in Bełchatów County